Mountain Creek State High School (MCSHS) is a co-educational state secondary school and is the largest school on Queensland's Sunshine Coast. It is located in the suburb of Mountain Creek, which is situated 96 kilometres (60 mi) north of Brisbane.

Structure 
The school is organized around five sub-schools that are designed to break down the large size of the school. They are named after local islands:

 Bribie (red) after Bribie Island
 Stradbroke (yellow) after Stradbroke Island
 Fraser (green) after Fraser Island
 Moreton (blue) after Moreton Island
 Mudjimba (purple) after Mudjimba Island, established in 2019

Consequently, each academic cohort of about 275 students in the middle school is taught by the same group of about 25 teachers, who are also responsible for pastoral care.

The school community is supported by The Creeker Foundation, the P&C Association, the Local Chaplaincy Committee (with two resident chaplains) and a network of community groups, including Lions Mooloolaba, Life Church Sunshine Coast, Goodlife Community Centre and Redfrogs Australia.

In 2015, the school began educating year 7 students. It has a strict catchment restriction.

Expertise 
In 2000, the school was recognized as one of Queensland's most progressive and innovative as a winner of Education Queensland's Showcase For Excellence Award.

International 
The school maintains an International Baccalaureate Diploma Programme, supporting a 5% international student population. The school also delivers international exposure trips to Asia, Europe and Latin America. It is a long-term member of the Council of International Schools Australia.

Innovation 
In 2018, the school began construction of a 3-storey, multi-million dollar, multi-purpose building. In 2019 the building, named The Leading Edge was opened, and features science laboratories and a digital technology hub. The school facilitates the Coding and Innovation Hub as part of the Sunshine Coast's innovation ecosystem. The Hub delivers training to students and staff on STEM concepts, digital creativity, and program development. In 2019, the school established a pilot eSports program.

Notable alumni
 Tahlia Randall, Australian rules footballer playing for the North Melbourne Football Club in the AFL Women's (AFLW) 
 Tyson Smoothy, rugby league player for the Melbourne Storm in the National Rugby League (NRL)
 Trent Loiero , rugby league player for the Melbourne Storm in the National Rugby League (NRL)
 Bryce Street, cricketer for the Queensland Bulls and Australia A
 Noah Cumberland, Australian rules footballer playing for the Richmond Football Club in the Australian Football League (AFL)

See also

Education in Australia
List of schools in Queensland

References

External links
Mountain Creek State High School home page

Public high schools in Queensland
Buderim
International Baccalaureate schools in Australia
Schools on the Sunshine Coast, Queensland
Educational institutions established in 1995
1995 establishments in Australia